Archduke Karl Ambrosius Joseph Johann Baptist of Austria-Este (Milan, 2 November 1785 – Tata, Hungary 2 September 1809) was an Archbishop of Esztergom.

Biography 

Born His Royal Highness Archduke Karl Ambrosius of Austria-Este, the sixth son of Archduke Ferdinand of Austria-Este (son of Maria Theresa of Austria and governor of Italy) and of his wife, Princess Maria Beatrice Ricciarda d'Este, Duchess of Massa and Princess of Carrara, Lady of Lunigiana.

He spent his youth in Monza, where his family had fled after the French invasion of the Duchy of Modena. After staying in Verona, Padua, Trieste and Ljubljana, his family moved in Wiener Neustadt.

Because of his fragility, he was intended for church life. He became Bishop of Vác in 1806 and Archbishop of Esztergom, two years later, making him Primate of Hungary.
He died one year later at the age of 23.

Ancestry

External links 
 www.catholic-hierarchy.org

18th-century Hungarian people
18th-century Italian people
Archbishops of Esztergom
Bishops of Vác
Hungarian Roman Catholics
Austria-Este
Modenese princes
Hungarian people of Italian descent
Italian expatriates in Hungary
Clergy from Milan
Burials at Esztergom Basilica
1785 births
1809 deaths
Austrian princes
Nobility from Milan
Grand Crosses of the Order of Saint Stephen of Hungary
Sons of monarchs